In metallurgy, refining consists of purifying an impure metal.  It is to be distinguished from other processes such as smelting and calcining in that those two involve a chemical change to the raw material, whereas in refining, the final material is usually identical chemically to the original one, only it is purer. The processes used are of many types, including pyrometallurgical and hydrometallurgical techniques.

Lead

Cupellation

One ancient process for extracting the silver from lead was cupellation.  Lead was melted in a bone ash 'test' or 'cupel' and air blown across the surface.  This oxidised the lead to litharge, and also oxidised other base metals present, the silver (and gold if present) remaining unoxidised.

In the 18th century, the process was carried on using a kind of reverberatory furnace, but differing from the usual kind in that air was blown over the surface of the molten lead from bellows or (in the 19th century) blowing cylinders.

Pattinson process

The Pattinson process was patented by its inventor, Hugh Lee Pattinson, in 1833 who described it as "An improved method for separating silver from lead". It exploited the fact that in molten lead containing traces of silver the first metal to solidify out of the melt is lead, leaving the remaining liquid richer in silver. Pattinson's equipment consisted basically of nothing more complex than a row of up to 13 iron pots, which were heated from below. Some lead, naturally containing a small percentage of silver, was loaded into the central pot and melted. This was then allowed to cool. As the lead solidified it is removed using large perforated iron ladles and moved to the next pot in one direction, and the remaining metal which was now richer in silver was then transferred to the next pot in the opposite direction.  The process was repeated from one pot to the next, the lead accumulating in the pot at one end and metal enriched in silver in the pot at the other. The level of enrichment possible is limited by the lead-silver eutectic and typically the process stopped around 600 to 700 ounces per ton (approx 2%), so further separation is carried out by cupellation.

The process was economic for lead containing at least 250 grams of silver per ton.

Parkes process
The Parkes process, patented in 1850 uses molten zinc. Zinc is not miscible with lead and when the two molten metals are mixed the zinc separates and floats to the top carrying only some 2% lead. However silver preferentially dissolves in zinc, so the zinc that floats to the top carries a significant proportion of the silver. The melt is then cooled until the zinc solidifies and the zinc crust is skimmed off.  The silver is then recovered by volatalising the zinc. The Parkes process largely replaced the Pattinson process, except where the lead contained insufficient silver, in which case the Pattinson process provided a method to enrich it in silver to about 40 to 60 ounces per ton, at which concentration it could be treated using the Parkes' process.

Copper

Fire refining
The initial product of copper smelting was impure black copper, which was then repeatedly melted to purify it, alternately oxidizing and reducing it. In one of the melting stages, lead was added.  Gold and silver preferentially dissolved in this, thus providing a means of recovering these precious metals.  To produce purer copper suitable for making copper plates or hollow-ware, further melting processes were undertaken, using charcoal as fuel.  The repeated application of such fire-refining processes was capable of producing copper that was 99.25% pure.

Electrolytic refining
The purest copper is obtained by an electrolytic process, undertaken using a slab of impure copper as the anode and a thin sheet of pure copper as the cathode.  The electrolyte is an acidic solution of copper sulphate.  By passing electricity through the cell, copper is dissolved from the anode and deposited on the cathode.  However impurities either remain in solution or collect as an insoluble sludge.  This process only became possible following the invention of the dynamo; it was first used in South Wales in 1869.

Iron

Wrought iron

The product of the blast furnace is pig iron, which contains 4–5% carbon and usually some silicon.  To produce a forgeable product a further process was needed, usually described as fining, rather than refining.  From the 16th century, this was undertaken in a finery forge.  At the end of the 18th century, this began to be replaced by puddling (in a puddling furnace), which was in turn gradually superseded by the production of mild steel by the Bessemer process.

Refined iron

The term refining is used in a narrower context.  Henry Cort's original puddling process only worked where the raw material was white cast iron, rather than the grey pig iron that was the usual raw material for finery forges.  To use grey pig iron, a preliminary refining process was necessary to remove silicon.  The pig iron was melted in a running out furnace and then run out into a trough.  This process oxidised the silicon to form a slag, which floated on the iron and was removed by lowering a dam at the end of the trough.  The product of this process was a white metal, known as finers metal or refined iron.

Precious metals
Precious metal refining is the separation of precious metals from noble-metalliferous materials.   Examples of these materials include used catalysts, electronic assemblies, ores or metal alloys.

Process
In order to isolate noble-metalliferous materials, pyrolysis and/or hydrolysis procedures are used. In pyrolysis, the noble-metalliferous products are released from the other materials by solidifying in a melt to become cinder and then poured off or oxidized. In hydrolysis, the noble-metalliferous products are dissolved either in aqua regia (consisting of hydrochloric acid and nitric acid) or in hydrochloric acid and chlorine gas in solution.  Subsequently, certain metals can be precipitated or reduced directly with a salt, gas, organic, and/or nitro hydrate connection. Afterwards, they go through cleaning stages or are recrystallized. The precious metals are separated from the metal salt by calcination.  The noble-metalliferous materials are hydrolyzed first and thermally prepared (pyrolysed) thereafter.  The processes are better yielding when using catalysts that may sometimes contain precious metals themselves. When using catalysts, the recycling product is removed in each case and driven several times through the cycle.

See also 
 
 
 List of alumina refineries

Bibliography
 J. Day and R. F. Tylecote, The Industrial Revolution in Metals (The Institute of Metals, London 1991).
 Söderberg, A. 2011. Eyvind Skáldaspillir's silver - refining and standards in pre-monetary economies in the light of finds from Sigtuna and Gotland. Situne Dei 2011. Edberg, R. Wikström, A. (eds). Sigtuna.
 R. F. Tylecote, A history of metallurgy (Institute of materials, London 1992).
 Newcastle University: Hugh Lee Pattinson

References

Metallurgical processes